Connersville is a city in Fayette County, east central Indiana, United States,  east by southeast of Indianapolis. The population was 13,481 at the 2010 census. The city is the county seat of and the largest and only incorporated town in Fayette County. The city is in the center of a large rural area of east central Indiana; the nearest significant city is Richmond,  to the northeast by road. Connersville is home to the county's one and only high school. The economy is supported by local manufacturing, retail and healthcare. Employment and population have been declining since the 1960s and it is among the poorest areas of the state in median household income and other economic measures.

The city is among the oldest cities in Indiana and the former Indiana Territory, having been established in 1813 by its namesake John Conner.

Geography and climate
Connersville is located at  (39.653931, -85.137709). The center of town is roughly Central Ave and 5th street in the southern portion. Annexations have pushed the city limits of Connersville north along Indiana 1 (Western Avenue) to the county line.

Most of the town is located on the north bank of the west fork of the Whitewater River. The local area has nearly flat to gently rolling topography. The local region (and all of Fayette County and the state of Indiana) are part of the Eastern (U.S.) Broadleaf Forest Environment biome. Much of the surrounding Whitewater Valley vegetation would be classified as riparian woodland or gallery forest. There are 124 native tree species, including 17 varieties of oak, as well as black walnut, sycamore, and tulip tree (yellow poplar), the state tree. Fruit trees—apple, cherry, peach, and pear—are common.
Common native mammals are the red fox, common cottontail, muskrat, raccoon, opossum, and several types of squirrel.

Connersville gets 41 inches of rain per year. Snowfall is 22 inches. About 1/3 of days have measurable precipitation. About half the days are sunny. The July high averages 84 degrees, and the January low averages 16. The hottest month is August, the coolest February, and the wettest December. Floods, major storms, and tornados are relatively infrequent, but do occur.

Economics
The economic base is mostly manufacturing, followed by retail and health care. Little remains of the old industrial base. There are fewer than 600 union employees in the town. The closure of the Visteon plant in 2007, resulting in loss of over 900 jobs was a chief contributing factor in the town reaching the brink of bankruptcy in Mar. 2014. The largest employers are Stant, Walmart, and Howden Roots (formerly Roots/Dresser), followed by various retail establishments and schools. Wayzata Home Products Connersville, a unit of 6 Square Cabinet Co. based in Minnetonka, Minnesota,. began production in March 2014, but has since closed.

The mean house price in 2012 was $67,000, and the median household income $29,000 (versus $47,649 for all of Indiana).

Primarily due to loss of unionized manufacturing jobs and labor, the population of Connersville has been declining since the 1960s. The unemployment rate in Connersville and surrounding Fayette County is among the highest in the state, and has been for most of the last decade and even longer. In 2018, it ranged around 5%. A significant portion of workers in Connersville are employed in Shelbyville, Greensburg, and other outlying towns with better local economies.

The city is the economic center of a micropolitan statistical area of the same name. It is also part of Richmond-Connersville, IN Combined Statistical Area.

Government
Connersville is a chartered city under the state of Indiana, with an elected mayor, clerk/treasurer, and 7-member city council. Five council members are by district, and two are at-large. City government consists of eight departments: Mettel Field/Airport, EMS/First Aid, Fire, Parks & Recreation, Police, Street, Connersville Utilities (water, sewer, storm drains), and Transfer Station & Recycling. Each department is headed by a full-time salaried department head. Courts and jails are located in the city but administered by the county.

History

Connersville is named for settler John Conner, older brother of William Conner, an early Indiana settler and politician. There was also, at least through 1795, Connerstown, a small Shawnee village near Lancaster, Ohio, named for John's father, Richard Conner.

Whitewater Valley and pre-European inhabitants
The Whitewater River Valley running north-south through eastern Indiana and southwestern Ohio was created by the Late Wisconsin Glaciation ending 13,600 years ago. Fayette County was at the southern fringe of the glaciation at that time. The Ice Age was punctuated by several prolonged warm periods during which the glaciers disappeared entirely from the temperate latitudes and a climate similar to today or even warmer prevailed. The flood waters produced resulted in lakes; breaching of the lakes resulted in rivers and streams carving the hills and valleys we see today.

In the Northwest Territory during the latter half of the 18th century, the Miami Indians were dominant in the region, but the Potawatomi and Shawnee had a significant presence. Delaware Indians, displaced from their eastern homelands by European settlement, migrated west and settled along the forks of the Whitewater River. The Whitewater Valley and Ohio River Valley area had also been inhabited earlier by other Native Americans called mound builders for their characteristic large burial mounds still in evidence today.

The geological aspects of the Whitewater River Valley contributed to early settlement after defeat of the Delaware Indians by Gen. Anthony Wayne at Fallen Timbers in 1794, followed on August 3, 1795, by the Treaty of Greenville (Ohio) ceding most of Ohio and a sliver of southeastern Indiana to the United States. The valley, running south and southeasterly from east central Indiana to the Ohio River Valley, provided a convenient conduit for migration through Fort Washington (Cincinnati) from points east, settlements on the Ohio River, and settlers from Kentucky to northern and central Indiana Territory. Squatters engaged in agriculture and trading were occupying federal lands well before land sales in Indiana Territory began in 1801. An Indian trail paralleled the river from the Ohio Valley northward to the forks, then went along the East Fork to Eli Creek, thence taking a northwesterly direction passing through what was later Connersville, and then on to the Delaware villages strung along the White River from north of present-day Indianapolis to modern Muncie.

Conner's Post
John Conner, his brother William, and others arrived in the Whitewater Valley from south central Ohio in 1802, establishing a fur trading post in an unpopulated area near what was later to become Cedar Grove on the Whitewater River (Franklin County) at the very fringe of the European penetration into the wilderness of Indiana. According to research by J.L. Heineman, the trading post was located in the middle of what is now Eastern Avenue, at the west end of Charles Street. At that time, the region was inhabited by Delaware Indians. In 1809 the Treaty of Fort Wayne was signed, by the terms of which the land locally known as the "Twelve Mile Purchase" was ceded by the Indians to the government. This tract included a strip  in width lying west of the 1795 Greenville treaty line which ran from the midpoint of the Indiana/Ohio border southwest to the Ohio River cutting off a thin wedge of southeastern Indiana. The strip included most of Fayette County except the extreme northern portion (part of the later "New Purchase"). Sales of public land by the United States Government in Indiana began in 1801. In that year the Cincinnati, Ohio, Land Office began selling land in a wedge of government land in southeastern Indiana known as the "Gore" (organized as Dearborn County in 1803) which included all of what is today Fayette County. Conner obtained title to his plat in 1811.

First 50 years – through the Civil War
The exodus of the Delaware Indians from Indiana after the War of 1812, completed by June 1813, deprived John Conner of his field for trading. After 1812, Indian resistance to settlement in the Indiana Territory became nearly non-existent, so Conner busied himself with another task.

John Conner laid out the town on the north side of the west fork of the Whitewater River in March 1813, adjacent to the fur trading post. The original plat was for 62 lots bounded by what are today Central Avenue to the west and Water Street to the east, Third Street to the south, and Sixth Street to the north. The first constructions in the town were a saw mill and grist mill north of town utilizing water power, and a general store and distillery in town. The influx of settlers was initially sparse – as late as 1815, there were only four cabins in the town. The boundary lines for Fayette County were established in December 1818, and Connersville was chosen as the county seat.

Conner served briefly as sheriff of the newly organized Fayette County. In 1820, John Conner helped plat the new capital of Indianapolis, and in 1822 relocated his fur trading business to Noblesville, north of Indianapolis. He also served as state senator and representative. He died in Indianapolis in April 1826 and was buried there. No trace remains of his grave.

The first post office in Connersville opened in January, 1818. The first courthouse was started in 1819 and finished in 1822. The first newspaper, the Indiana Statesman, was started in 1824. The first church in the village was Presbyterian, constructed in 1824. A seminary building was constructed in 1828, later razed, and the first regular school building in Connersville was constructed on the site in 1858. The Indiana Gazetteer in 1833 stated the population of Connersville as 500. The village was incorporated as a town in 1841. Connersville served as an important link on the Whitewater Canal linking the Whitewater River to the Ohio River, opened in 1847. The canal ceased to be used for through traffic in 1849, though limited local commerce continued. The first railroad, the Cincinnati, Hamilton and Indianapolis Railroad, reached Connersville in 1862. It extended from Rushville through Connersville and Oxford to Hamilton, Ohio.

For many years prior to the Civil War, and even for some time after that struggle, the main industries of the town were milling, pork packing, and woolen manufacturing.

In 1857, a separate village, East Connersville, was platted on the south bank of the west fork of the Whitewater River, and had its own government.  It was annexed by Connersville some time in the 1920s.

Early growth – pre-industrial age
The Roots blower, a type of air turbine, was invented by the Roots brothers in Connersville in the 1850s, patented in 1859, and manufactured in Connersville for over 150 years.

The town of Connersville became a chartered city in June 1869, and William H. Beck was chosen as its first mayor. The first high school opened in 1875. In 1882, James H. Fearis, of Connersville, started the Bell telephone exchange. The Connersville Electric Light Company commenced operations in August 1890 as the first supplier of electric power in the city. Central Avenue was paved with brick in 1902, and became the first paved street in the city.

Prior to the advent of automotive manufacturing, Connersville for decades was colloquially known as the "furniture and buggy town" because of the dominance of those two industries in the town.

In 1898, Stant was founded in Connersville, and became the world's largest producer of piano tuning pins.

During the school year 1906–07, Dr. W. Otto Miessner established the first public high school band in the U.S. at Connersville High School.

Automotive and industrial age to 1960s
In the early 20th century, the town became known as "Little Detroit" because of its importance to the automobile industry. Automobiles manufactured in Connersville include Auburn, Cord, Duesenberg, Ansted, Empire, Lexington, and McFarlan. The Willys MB Jeep body was manufactured in Connersville during the 1940s. Much of the western portion of town was occupied by light industry for the 150 years prior to 1990. Companies included Roots Blower (later Dresser Industries), Stant, McQuay Norris, Design & Manufacturing Co. (D&M), H.H. Robertson, Visteon, Philco Ford.

The 1980s were the beginning of the end for Connersville automotive manufacturing, which had been on the wane for more than a decade.

McQuay-Norris, manufacturer of auto parts based in St. Louis, got its start in Connersville in 1921 by acquisition of Wainwright Engineering, a privately held local company manufacturing automotive engines. In 1969, it was acquired by Eaton, Yale & Towne, and closed its Connersville and Indianapolis plants in 1983.

Design & Manufacturing (D&M) company got its start when Rex Regenstrief purchased American Kitchens in 1958 and renamed the company. By 1972, D&M controlled 25% of the nation’s dishwasher market. Design & Manufacturing’s assets were sold to White Consolidated Industries in 1987 and the firm was dissolved in 1990.

Architectural Products Division of H. H. Robertson purchased land owned by the defunct Lexington Motor Car Co. in February 1960. Robertson was a victim of hard times for the industry in the late 1980s and the Connersville plant was merged with operations in Pittsburgh, Pennsylvania, starting in 1986.

Decline from 1960s onward
Due to high cost of local union labor and economies of scale elsewhere, most industry departed in the 1980s and 1990s. Connersville union labor is down from a high of 10,000 to about 600 workers in 2012. Connersville’s role in automobile manufacturing ceased when the Visteon factory shut down in 2007. Part of the decline may be logistical – with the construction of the interstate highway system in the 1950s, Connersville found itself not directly in line with routes between major cities: I-70 from Indianapolis to Columbus, I-74 from Indianapolis to Cincinnati, and U.S. 40 from Indianapolis to Richmond, none intersecting Connersville. The former Roots Blower/Dresser Industries, now GE Energy, remains, but with a skeleton staff of fewer than 100 full-time employees. Stant also remains with a little over 200 employees. There are still some furniture making, machine shops, and other local manufacturing establishments.

In March 2014, the city declared a fiscal emergency when revenue fell short of expenses, and the city nearly fell into bankruptcy.

Culture and recreation
Fayette County Public Library is located in the city.

There is a golf course west of town known as Willowbrook Country Club.

Connersville has an indoor movie theater, Showtime Cinemas.

There is a basketball stadium at the old high school at 19th and Grand ave, and a football field at the high school on Ranch Road where high school events are held.  Both are available for other events, gymnastics, track and field, etc.

Overnight and long-term camping are available at the Whitewater River Campground south of town. The Heritage MusicFest takes place every year in June at the campground. Local bands ranging in style from bluegrass to rock perform.

Parks and preserves
Roberts Park, located in the northeast corner of town, contains a public pool, community center, grandstand, and racetrack. It hosts the annual Fayette County Free Fair, a week-long event held late in the summer.

Historic places

Elmhurst, an estate south of town on St. Rd. 121 built in 1831, was the home of Caleb Blood Smith, who served in Abraham Lincoln's cabinet. It also serves as the site of an annual re-enactment of the American Civil War. The estate was formerly known as Conners Elm Park.

Fayette County Historical Museum is located in the city.

The Canal House, built in 1842 as headquarters for the Whitewater Canal Company, is in the city.

In addition to the Canal House and Elmhurst, the Fayette County Courthouse and Roberts Park are listed on the National Register of Historic Places.

Demographics

As of 2019, the population is estimated to be 12,796 people. About 55% of Fayette county's population lives in the town.

2010 census
As of the census of 2010, there were 13,481 people, 5,582 households, and 3,506 families residing in the city. The racial makeup of the city was 95.7% White, 2.1% African American, 0.2% Native American, 0.3% Asian, 0.3% from other races, and 1.3% from two or more races. Hispanic or Latino of any race were 1.0% of the population.

There were 5,582 households, of which 31.1% had children under the age of 18 living with them, 41.9% were married couples living together, 15.2% had a female householder with no husband present, 5.8% had a male householder with no wife present, and 37.2% were non-families. 31.6% of all households were made up of individuals, and 13.8% had someone living alone who was 65 years of age or older. The average household size was 2.37 and the average family size was 2.95.

The median age in the city was 39.4 years. 24.2% of residents were under the age of 18; 8.2% were between the ages of 18 and 24; 24.3% were from 25 to 44; 25.6% were from 45 to 64; and 17.7% were 65 years of age or older. The gender makeup of the city was 47.7% male and 52.3% female.

2000 census
As of the census of 2000, there were 15,411 people, 6,382 households, and 4,135 families residing in the city.

Transportation
There is no commercial air or bus service to Connersville. There is Amtrak (passenger) and CSX (freight) rail service. The Whitewater River, while mostly navigable, is not commercially viable as a means of transportation.

Freight moves into and out of Connersville by truck, principally via State Road 1 north and Interstate 70 to Indianapolis, and State Road 1 south, U.S. Route 52, and Interstate 74 to Cincinnati. State Road 44 is mostly local and in-county traffic. SR 1 and SR 44 are both narrow two-lane state roads. The nearest large cities are Cincinnati  to the southeast; Indianapolis  to the west; Dayton, Ohio, . to the east; Louisville, Kentucky,  to the south; and Columbus, Ohio,  to the east.

Airport
Mettel Field is a private aviation airport located three nautical miles (6 km) north of the central business district of Connersville. There is no commercial service. It is owned by the Connersville Board of Aviation Commissioners. The nearest commercial airport is Cincinnati/Northern Kentucky International Airport,  to the southeast.

Railroad

Amtrak, the national passenger rail system, provides service to Connersville. Each of two trains provides service three days a week. The westbound train provides service to Indianapolis, Lafayette, and Chicago. The eastbound train provides service to Cincinnati, cities in Kentucky, and points east ending at New York City.

Bus and taxi service
There is no transit bus service to Connersville, but local public transit is available to all residents by calling the public transit office. There is 1 local taxi service in town.

Highways
 Indiana State Road 1 runs north-south through downtown Connersville north to beyond Fort Wayne and south to Lawrenceburg
 Indiana State Road 44 runs east-west through downtown Connersville west to Martinsville and east to the Ohio state line
 Indiana State Road 121 runs north-south from intersection with SR44 in downtown Connersville south to Metamora
 Interstate 70,  to the north via SR1 runs east-west from Indianapolis to Columbus, Ohio
 U.S. Route 40,  to the north via SR1 runs east-west from just south of Indianapolis to Richmond, IN.

Cemeteries
There are a few private and church cemeteries located in outlying unincorporated areas.

Hospital
Reid Health operates the hospital and associated entities in Connersville, having purchased most of the assets of the former Fayette Regional Health System after it filed for bankruptcy in 2018.

Schools and churches
About 44% of the population is affiliated with a religious congregation. 25% are Roman Catholic, followed by United Methodist, Southern Baptist, and non-denominational Christian. In town, there are churches representing Catholic, Methodist, Baptist, Lutheran, Presbyterian, Reformed Episcopal and Church of Jesus Christ of Latter-Day Saint faiths, as well as about a dozen non-denominational Christian churches. There are also a number of Pentecostal (including Charismatic and Revival) churches and organizations.

All public schools belong to the Fayette County School Corporation. There are about 1,200 students in high school, 700 in middle school, 1,800 in public elementary schools, and 300 in parochial elementary schools (as of 2012). Public elementary schools and some parochial elementary schools include kindergarten. The Whitewater Technical Career Center is a secondary school including grades 11–12 with an enrollment of over 500; it prepares non-college-bound students for careers in the trades. There are no institutions of higher learning in Connersville. The Connersville Center offers extension courses through Indiana University East.

The Fayette County School Corporation garnered national attention in November 2017 with a series of articles on CBS News on the subject of school nutrition programs, nationwide—featuring Connersville schools' partnership with a food service company, Chartwell's, to offer free breakfast, lunch and supper services to all children in their schools—integrating breakfasts with classroom learning activity, offering a "second chance" breakfast for teens, and providing after-school movies with a free supper.

Middle, high and trade schools
 Connersville High School
 Connersville Middle School (formerly Junior High North formerly Connersville Sr. High)
 Whitewater Career Center (formerly Connersville Area Vocational School)

Elementary schools
 Eastview
 Grandview
 Frazee
 Fayette Central
 Everton

Parochial elementary schools
 St. Gabriel's (Catholic)
 Community (Christian)
 Faith (Christian)

Media

Connersville has a daily newspaper called The News Examiner in continuous publication (including predecessor papers) since 1849.

Radio station WLPK-AM 1580, owned by Rodgers Broadcasting Corporation and licensed to Connersville, operates with local programming and a classic hits format; the station simulcasts on FM frequency 106.9. For many years Connersville simulcast AM/FM WCNB/WIFE radio. The FM which was located at 100.3 was sold to Radio One Communications for $18 million in 2006 and re-located to Cincinnati, Ohio. There is now a WIFE-FM radio station (94.3), whose tower is located in Rush County, Indiana.

Connersville High School's daily TV news program, CHS Today, was the first student-produced TV news program in the United States. It began in 1970 with presenters Dennis Sullivan and Ron Stevens. At first, it was broadcast only to the school via closed-circuit TV. Later it expanded and now airs live at 11:00 a.m. weekdays to the community and re-airs twice in the evening at 6:45 and 10:45pm via TV3 on local cable.

Notable people
 Phil Cox, 1972 Indiana Mr. Basketball, 1972 Graduate of Connersville High School, and member of 1972 Indiana High School basketball champions.
 Howard Garns, creator of the logic game Sudoku, was born in Connersville on March 2, 1905.
 Finly H. Gray was a US Congressman elected to represent Indiana's 6th and 10th Districts in the United States House of Representatives, serving from 1911 to 1917 and 1933 to 1939. He also served as Mayor of Connersville from 1904 to 1910. Gray is buried in Dale Cemetery, located on Memorial Drive in Connersville. Gray Road, on the west side of Connersville, is named for him. 
 Scott Halberstadt, television actor, was born in Connersville in 1976 and graduated from Connersville High School in 1994.
 Tom T. Hall, country singer and Grand Ole Opry member, spent time in Connersville early in his career and wrote "Thank You, Connersville" about the experience.
 Matt Howard, a three-time Academic All-American starting forward for Butler University's men's basketball team who has since played professionally for several European teams, is a 2007 graduate of Connersville High School. He played in the 2010 and 2011 NCAA Championship games. In February 2011, Howard was selected as the top Academic All-American in the University category (chosen from all twelve Academic All-America teams, including football).
 Virginia Claypool Meredith, "Queen of American Agriculture," born in Connersville
 James N. Huston, Treasurer of the United States 1889–91, lived in Connersville most of his life, founding a local bank, Citizen's Bank.
 Carol J. Pereyra, founder of Going Bonkers Magazine, raised in Connersville, Indiana and attended middle school and high school.
 Betsy Ross, former ESPN anchor, graduate of Connersville High School, now freelance broadcaster/emcee in Cincinnati, Ohio.
 Caleb Blood Smith was a Congressman and the Secretary of the Interior in the Lincoln administration. He was the second occupant of the Elmhurst mansion.
 Oliver H. Smith was a Congressman and Senator. He built the Elmhurst mansion at the south edge of Connersville in 1831.
 Dan Toler, rock musician with the Allman Brothers Band and Gregg Allman Band (died 2013)
 Robert Wise, one of Hollywood's most acclaimed directors and producers, graduated from Connersville High School in 1932. The CHS auditorium, the Robert E. Wise Center for Performing Arts, was named in his honor. Wise is known for his direction of The Sound of Music and West Side Story.
 Mark Rose, vice president of design and engineering at Busch Gardens in Tampa, Florida.
E. L. Cord, Industrialist/Automaker purchased assets from Lexington/Ansted to begin manufacturing Cord, Auburn, and Duesenberg (parts only) in Connersville. He later founded American Airlines in Dallas, Texas.
 Newton Claypool, Former member of the Indiana House of Representatives and Indiana Senate (1825-1845). Patriarch of the Claypool Family in Indiana. Grandfather of Virginia Claypool Meredith. Newton's son Austin, served as one of the first Trustees for Purdue University 1874-1875
 Joey Sturgis, music producer, sound engineer, musician, drummer.
 Louis T. Michener, Indiana Attorney General (1886-1890), campaign manager and political adviser to Benjamin Harrison.

See also

 List of cities in Indiana
 Connersville Township, Fayette County, Indiana

References

Further reading
 A Little Journey to Connersville, Elbert Hubbard, 1917, Roycrofters, N.Y. 23pgs.
 Sons of the Wilderness: John and William Conner, Charles N. Thompson, 1988, Clerisy Press, KY. 283pgs.

External links

 City of Connersville, Indiana website
 http://www.newsexaminer.com
 http://fayettein.schooldesk.net/

 https://connersvillehistory.wordpress.com/

Cities in Indiana
Cities in Fayette County, Indiana
Populated places established in 1813
Micropolitan areas of Indiana
County seats in Indiana
1813 establishments in Indiana Territory